Man with the Hat  is an album by American jazz saxophonists Grace Kelly and Phil Woods. It was released on January 25, 2011. Allmusic review.

The title of the album refers to when Woods invited Kelly, when she was 14 years old, on stage during one of his performances and presented her with his iconic leather cap as a gift after her solo on "I'll Remember April".

Kelly, in tribute, wrote the title track, "Man with the Hat", in honor of Woods.

Track listing
"Man with the Hat" (8:45)
"Love Song" (5:19)
"People Time" (6:33)
"Ballad for Very Sad and Very Tired Lotus Eaters" (7:00)
"Gone" (5:04)
"Everytime We Say Goodbye" (4:12)
"The Way You Look Tonight" (6:22)

Personnel
Grace Kelly: Alto saxophone, vocals
Phil Woods: Alto saxophone
Monty Alexander: Piano, Rhodes, Melodica
Evan Gregor: Bass
Bill Goodwin: Drums
Jordan Perlson: Percussion (5)

References

2011 albums
Grace Kelly (musician) albums
Phil Woods albums